The Irish League in season 1925–26 comprised 12 teams, and Belfast Celtic won the championship.

League standings

Results

References
Northern Ireland - List of final tables (RSSSF)

NIFL Premiership seasons
North
Football
Football
1925–26 in Northern Ireland association football